Héloïse Côté (born 1979) is a Québécoise author of fantasy novels and a researcher in the sciences of education.

Biography

Héloïse Côté began studying in 1998 for a Bachelor of Science in Education at Laval University in Quebec. Rather than teaching high school at the end of her undergraduate studies, as she had originally planned, she continued at Laval for her master's degree.  She accumulated four annual citations on the honour roll of the Faculty of Education, and another on the honour roll of the Faculty of Graduate Studies. Côté also won the prize for the best Master's dissertation and the Raymond-Blais medal awarded by the Association of Laval University alumni to a recent graduate for the merit of her activities.

Between 2004 and 2006, Côté published the three volumes of the fantasy trilogy Les Chroniques de l'Hudres: Les Conseillers du Roi, Les Enfants du solstice and L'Ourse et le Boucher (English: The Councilors of the King, The Children of the Solstice and The Bear and the Butcher). Literary critic Laurent Laplante remarked upon the alert style and steady pace, agreeing that the writing is not dazzling but correct and a promising discipline.

Côté obtained a doctorate from Laval University in psychopedagogy. She is interested in the growing presence of artists in the public sphere in the West, and in particular in the integration of arts and culture in Quebec schools. In 2008 Côté became a postdoctoral fellow at the Centre for Research on Ethics of the University of Montreal; her studies are of the relationship between contemporary school and culture.

In 2008, Côté published the fantasy novel Les exilés (The Exiles).

On May 15, 2011, in a record-setting vote, Côté won the first twinned Aurora/Boréal Award for best fantasy or science fiction novel in French for La Tueuse de dragons, with an accompanying prize from SF Canada.

Works

Fiction
Les Chroniques de l'Hudres trilogy:

Les Voyageurs trilogy:

Non-fiction
Essays:

Book:

References

1979 births
Living people
French Quebecers
Université Laval alumni
Writers from Quebec
21st-century Canadian novelists
Canadian women essayists
Canadian women novelists
Canadian novelists in French
Canadian women non-fiction writers
21st-century Canadian women writers
21st-century Canadian essayists
Canadian non-fiction writers in French
Academic staff of Université Laval